Grand Coteau may refer to:

Places
 Grand Coteau, Louisiana, a town in the United States
 Grand Coteau; former name of Sainte-Julie, Quebec, Canada
  (Grand Coteau Forest), Lorraine, Quebec, Canada
  (Grand Coteau Pond), Mascouche, Quebec, Canada

Facilities and structures
 Villa Grand-Coteau, Quebec, Canada; a former building in the Mont-Saint-Bruno National Park
 Grand Coteau Heritage Centre, Shaunavon, Saskatchewan, Canada
 Le Grand Coteau, Noizay, Indre-et-Loire, France; a country estate owned by Francis Poulenc

Battles
 The Battle of Grand Coteau (Battle of Bayou Bourbeux), fought during the American Civil War in 1863
 Battle of Grand Coteau (North Dakota), a battle between Metis and Sioux in 1851

Other uses
 "Grand Coteau", a placename, see List of place names of French origin in the United States

See also

 Grande Côte (disambiguation)